Terry Pratchett's Going Postal is a two-part television film adaptation of Going Postal by Terry Pratchett, adapted by Richard Kurti and Bev Doyle and produced by The Mob, which was first broadcast on Sky1, and in high definition on Sky1 HD, at the end of May 2010.

It is the third in a series of adaptations, following Terry Pratchett's Hogfather and Terry Pratchett's The Colour of Magic. It was announced as part of an investment of at least £10 million into adaptations of novels, including Chris Ryan's Strike Back and Skellig by David Almond. Filming began in May 2009 in Budapest. As is now traditional with The Mob's Discworld adaptations, several fans were invited to appear as extras.

Plot
After years of undertaking confidence tricks, Moist von Lipwig is caught by the Ankh-Morpork City Watch, and is sentenced to death under his current alias, Albert Spangler. After a brief spell in prison he is hanged by the neck, but not killed. He is brought before Patrician Havelock Vetinari who likens himself to an angel, offering Moist a change of life. He gives Moist the choice to either become the new Postmaster or be executed by falling down a deep pit.

Moist immediately attempts to escape but is caught by his parole officer Mr Pump, a golem, and brought to the rundown post office where he meets his two staff: the elderly Junior Postman Tolliver Groat and his assistant, the pin-obsessed Stanley Howler. Moist learns that the post office has been superseded by semaphore towers known as "Clacks" which send messages using light signals which are faster than sending letters by post and owned by the unscrupulous Reacher Gilt.

Initially Moist attempts to escape his duty, but realises that he cannot get away without overcoming Mr Pump, so he goes to the Golem Trust to help understand how golems are created and controlled. There he meets Adora Belle Dearheart for whom he begins to develop feelings. His skills prove to be useful in making the post office popular again; he invents the postage stamp in an attempt to raise money (which proves to be highly successful), starts an express post service to neighbouring cities and hires every available golem in the city to supplement his workforce.

While staying in the post office Moist begins to experience visions which show him that some of his confidence tricks led to tragedies for those he conned, which result in him having feelings of remorse for the first time. These feelings are heightened when he discovers that Adora Belle's father, Robert Dearheart, was indirectly a victim of one of his cons, and as a result lost ownership of his invention, the Clacks. Moist confesses his past misdeeds to Adora Belle just as the post office is set afire. Moist sets his own safety aside and runs into the burning building to rescue Stanley Howler. Before finding Stanley, he encounters Mr Gryle, a banshee assassin, who confesses that he killed the previous four Postmasters on behalf of Gilt. Just as Gryle is about to strike, Moist calls on the haunted letters in the post office to stop Gryle, which they do.

The burning of the post office means that the people of Ankh-Morpork are turning back to the "Clacks" for sending their messages, so Moist comes up with a plan to draw people back to the post office by pretending that he has experienced a vision telling him where the gods have buried money to help repair the post office (in reality the money was a hidden stash from his past cons). This succeeds, so Moist announces a new long distance delivery service.

Meanwhile, Adora Belle Dearheart is working on a way to jam up the Clacks with the help of a group of hackers (clacks-crackers) called "The Smoking Gnu" which they succeed in doing temporarily. The Clacks' chief engineer, Mr Pony, finds a way of preventing the jamming process, but Pony begins to see that working for Gilt is wrong and presents Adora with evidence to prove that Gilt had the past four postmasters, as well as Adora's brother, killed.

When an attempt to jam the Clacks fails Moist challenges Gilt to a race to the city of Uberwald, Clacks versus post office. The message to be sent is a biography of Havelock Vetinari. Moist and Adora employ a disused Clack tower to intercept and successfully change the message from a biography to the content of Gilt's ledgers, providing evidence of the hired murders, which is witnessed in Ankh-Morpork. Gilt flees before he can be arrested and Adora is made manager of the Clacks and begins a relationship with Moist. At the end of the story Gilt, having been tracked down by a Golem the same way Moist was, is awoken in Vetinari's office who asks Gilt if he knows anything about angels. When a postman (played by Terry Pratchett) later arrives at Vetinari's palace to deliver a letter to Gilt, Vetinari implies that Gilt killed himself by falling down the deep pit.

In a post-credits sequence, Groat and Stanley are sore and exhausted after making the round-trip to Überwald with a mail coach, but excited because they bet on Moist to win the race at odds of 50-1. Then Groat remembers that he left the betting slip in Überwald, so they immediately set off again in the desperate hope of finding it.

Cast
 Richard Coyle as Moist von Lipwig
 David Suchet as Reacher Gilt
 Charles Dance as Patrician Havelock Vetinari
 Claire Foy as Adora Belle Dearheart
 Nicholas Farrell as Mr Pump (voice)
 Marnix Van Den Broeke as Mr Pump (body)
 Jimmy Yuill as Mr Spools
 Steve Pemberton as Drumknott
 Andrew Sachs as Tolliver Groat
 Tamsin Greig as Miss Cripslock
 Ingrid Bolsø Berdal as Sgt Angua
 Adrian Schiller as Mr Gryle
 Ian Bonar as Stanley Howler
 Madhav Sharma as Horsefry
 Timothy West as Mustrum Ridcully
 Sir Terry Pratchett as Postman
 Ben Crompton as Mad Al

US Release

Both episodes of the miniseries were released on one DVD in the United States on 11 September 2011.

References

External links
 
 
 Preview of Going Postal on Sky.com
 Sneak peek pictures of Going Postal on Sky.com
 Official Going Postal site
 Official Going Postal trailer
 Extended Going Postal trailer
 Richard Coyle Interview

Discworld films and television series
Films shot in Budapest
Sky UK original programming
2010 British television series debuts
2010 British television series endings
English-language television shows
Golem films
Steampunk films
Films about postal systems
Films directed by Jon Jones (director)
Films set on fictional planets